Fallceon quilleri is a species of small minnow mayfly in the family Baetidae. It is found in Central America, North America. In North America its range includes the south half of Canada, all of Mexico, and the continental United States.

References

Mayflies
Articles created by Qbugbot
Insects described in 1923